Group A of the 2011 Fed Cup Asia/Oceania Zone Group I was one of two pools in the Asia/Oceania zone of the 2011 Fed Cup. Four teams competed in a round robin competition, with the top team and the bottom team proceeding to their respective sections of the play-offs: the top team played for advancement to the World Group II Play-offs, while the bottom team faced potential relegation to Group II.

Thailand vs. Uzbekistan

China vs. India

Thailand vs. China

Uzbekistan vs. India

China vs. Uzbekistan

Thailand vs. India

See also
Fed Cup structure

References

External links
 Fed Cup website

2011 Fed Cup Asia/Oceania Zone